The Wife of General Ling is a 1937 British drama film directed by Ladislao Vajda and starring Griffith Jones, Valéry Inkijinoff and Adrianne Renn. It was adapted from a novel by Dorothy Hope and Peter Cheyney. The film was made at Shepperton Studios by the independent company Premier-Stafford Productions.

Premise
A British secret service agent gets mixed up with a Chinese warlord.

Cast
 Griffith Jones as John Fenton 
 Valéry Inkijinoff as General Ling / Mr. Wong 
 Adrianne Renn as Tai Wong 
 Alan Napier as Governor 
 Anthony Eustrel as See Long 
 Jiro Soneya as Yuan 
 Hugh McDermott as Tracy 
 Gibson Gowland as Mike 
 Gabrielle Brune as Germaine 
 Lotus Fragrance as Tai's Maid 
 Marian Spencer as Lady Buckram 
 Billy Holland as Police Sergeant 
 George Merritt as Police Commissioner 
 Howard Douglas as Doctor

References

External links

1937 films
1937 drama films
British drama films
1930s English-language films
Films based on American novels
Films based on British novels
Films directed by Ladislao Vajda
Films set in Hong Kong
Films shot at Shepperton Studios
Films set in China
Films scored by Jack Beaver
British black-and-white films
1930s British films